Bootstrap Productions is a nonprofit collaborative arts and literary organization based in Lowell, Massachusetts, which is primarily known for its publishing arm, Bootstrap Press, a small-press publisher of contemporary experimental writing.

Begun in Boulder, Colorado in the winter of 1999, Bootstrap Productions originally formed as a parent organization combining Bootstrap Press, founded by Ryan Gallagher and Derek Fenner, and The @tached Document, a literary arts journal begun by Jeff Chester, Derek Fenner, and Todd McCarthy.

Both Derek Fenner and Ryan Gallagher are MFA graduates of Naropa University's Jack Kerouac School of Disembodied Poetics.

Bootstrap Press 
Bootstrap Press is a project of Bootstrap Productions which has published such books as David Michalski's Cosmos & Damian, Andrew Schelling's Two Elk: A High County Notebook, and the poetry collection For the Time Being: The Bootstrap Book of Poetic Journals.

Bootstrap Productions has published 8 books, 3 anthologies, 5 chapbooks, and 2 CDs in the past six years.

References

External links
Bootstrap Productions official site

Small press publishing companies
Publishing companies established in 1999
1999 establishments in Massachusetts